This article contains a list of fossil-bearing stratigraphic units in the state of Kansas, U.S.

Sites

See also

 Paleontology in Kansas

References

 

Kansas
Stratigraphic units
Stratigraphy of Kansas
Kansas geography-related lists
United States geology-related lists